Nusa Dua is a resort area built in the 1970s in the southern part of Bali, Indonesia. Known as an enclave of large five-star resorts, it covers 350 hectares of land and encloses more than 20 resorts. It is located 22 kilometers from Denpasar, the provincial capital of Bali, and is administered under South Kuta District, Badung Regency. Nusa Dua means two islands (nusa 'island', dua 'two'), because there are two islands in the bay of Bali Tourism Development Corporation area. On the southern side lies Peninsula Island, and on the northern side lies Nusa Dharma Island, which is smaller but shadier, and which contains the Pura/Temple Nusa Dharma.

Geger Beach
Geger Beach is located in Sawangan, about 3 kilometers from the southern area of Nusa Dua. The sea there is calm, which allows farmers to grow seaweed in the area, as well as being an attractive place for tourists to swim.

Water Blow
Water Blow is located in the Indonesia Tourism & Development Corporation (ITDC) district where large waves of sea water from the Indian Ocean continually crash against jagged limestone edges of a cliff. The water blow is the outcome of the narrowing crag below the cliff face that channels a surge of water up to 30 meters high from its base following strong currents. This phenomenon results in giant, irregular splashes of wave that can reach several meters high. The area provides a 240-degree lookout of dramatic seascape that is bordered by guardrails.

Tanjung Benoa

Immediately north of the Nusa Dua enclave is the peninsula of Tanjung Benoa, which includes cheaper hotels as well as Benoa village. A multi-denominational area, it includes a mosque and Chinese and Hindu temples close to each other. Much of the beach's sand was eroded away following the mining of the nearby barrier reef for construction materials.

Benoa Port, also located there, was previously used for yachts and small ships. In December 2012, it became the Benoa Cruise International Terminal's turnaround port, serving as both embarkation and debarkation point for cruise passengers. As a turnaround port, tourists can arrive or leave Benoa Port by either plane or cruise ship.

On December 26, 2012, the Bali Governor signed a permit to utilize, develop and manage the Benoa Bay area. 838 hectares reclaimed by PT Tirta Wahana Bali International will be used for luxury tourist facilities such as hotels, villas, apartments, an international hospital, and entertainment centers such as a Disneyland-like theme park.

Image gallery

See also

 Pecatu beach resort area

References

Populated places in Bali
Cultural Properties of Indonesia in Bali